Madala Backson Masuku (born 6 June 1965) is a South African politician, a former Member of Parliament of South Africa (MP) and a Member of the African National Congress (ANC). He is also a Central Committee member of the South African Communist Party (SACP). He was a Member of the National Assembly of South Africa and the Deputy Minister of Economic Development from 2014 to 2019. Masuku also served as a Member of the Mpumalanga Executive Council for Co-operative Governance and Traditional Affairs and Finance under premier David Mabuza.

See also

African Commission on Human and Peoples' Rights
Constitution of South Africa
History of the African National Congress
Politics in South Africa
Provincial governments of South Africa

References

External links

1965 births
Living people
South African Communist Party politicians
Members of the National Assembly of South Africa